Lipany ('lindens;' , ,  all lit. 'seven lindens') is a town in the Sabinov District, Prešov Region in northeastern Slovakia.

History 
The first written mention about Lipany comes from 1312. It gained town privileges in the 16th century.

Geography 
The Torysa River flows through the town.

Demographics 
According to the 2001 census, the town had 6,130 inhabitants. 91.17% of inhabitants were Slovaks, 7.37% Roma, 0.33% Czechs, 0.31% Ukrainians and 0.28% Rusyns. The religious make-up was 89.61% Roman Catholics, 5.99% Greek Catholics, 2.38% people with no religious affiliation and 0.31% Lutherans.

Twin towns — sister cities
Lipany is twinned with:

  Piwniczna-Zdrój, Poland
  Muszyna, Poland
  Strzyżów, Poland
  Gmina Fajsławice, Poland
  Jasło, Poland
  Khust, Ukraine

People 
 Adam Zreľák, a football player, born here
 Milan Gaľa, mayor of this town
 Heinrich Neumann von Héthárs, born here
 Pavol Šuhaj, a football player, born here
 Stanislav Varga, a football player, born here

See also 
 ŠK Odeva Lipany
 Sáros County

References

External links 
 Town website
 Jewish Lipany (formerly Hethars, Hungary)

Cities and towns in Slovakia
Šariš